Joan Hunt is a former international lawn bowls competitor for England.

Bowls career
In 1977 she won the silver medal in the fours at the 1977 World Outdoor Bowls Championship in Worthing with Joan Sparkes, Margaret Lockwood and Mabel Darlington and also competed in the pairs.

She won the 1969 & 1975 singles title and the 1975 pairs at the England Women's National Championships when bowling for Atherley BC and Hampshire.

She was a member of Farnborough Bowling Club, holding the office of Ladies President in 1966 & 1967. She was Club Champion three times and won the Ladies' Championship seven times between 1962-1972.

References

Living people
English female bowls players
Year of birth missing (living people)